The discography of the American rock musician Tom Waits spans five decades. It consists of 17 studio albums, 3 live albums, 7 compilation albums, 23 singles, 2 soundtracks and 1 box set. Waits has also released one video album and 16 music videos.

Waits's debut release was the 1973 single "Ol' '55", which was the lead single for his debut album Closing Time (1973). He began recording in 1971, but these first sessions would not be released until the beginning of the 1990s. For most of the 1970s he recorded for Asylum Records. After cutting his first soundtrack album for the Francis Ford Coppola musical film One from the Heart, Waits signed with Island Records for the 1980s.

The release of Bone Machine in 1992 brought him a Grammy Award, after a less prolific decade. After Island Records, Waits moved to Anti/Epitaph for Mule Variations, an album that won him a second Grammy. Since the mid-1980s, he has collaborated with his wife Kathleen Brennan. His latest studio album, titled Bad as Me, was released in 2011.

As of 2011, according to Nielsen Soundscan,  Waits has sold 4.6 million albums in the United States.

Discography

Albums

Studio albums

Soundtrack albums

Live albums

Compilation albums

Box sets

Singles

Retail singles

Promotional singles

Other appearances

Studio

Live

Featured artist and guest spots

Other 
1987 Smack My Crack: "The Pontiac", spoken-word piece
1993 Born to Choose: "Filipino Box Spring Hog", earlier release of Mule Variations song
2007 People Take Warning! Murder Ballads and Disaster Songs 1913–1938, by various artists: Waits wrote the introduction for this 3 CD reissue anthology produced by Christopher King and Henry "Hank" Sapoznik
2011 Hard Ground by Michael O'Brien: contributed poems to accompany photographs of homeless people in Austin, Texas taken by Michael O'Brien

Music videos

Video albums

References

Discography
Discographies of American artists
Rock music discographies